Eva Antalecová (born 18 January 1966) is a Slovak basketball player. She competed in the women's tournament at the 1992 Summer Olympics.

References

1966 births
Living people
Slovak women's basketball players
Olympic basketball players of Czechoslovakia
Basketball players at the 1992 Summer Olympics
Sportspeople from Prešov